Quercus hui is a species of flowering plant in the family Fagaceae, native to south-east China and Hainan. It was first described in 1928. It is placed in subgenus Cerris, section Cyclobalanopsis.

References

hui
Flora of Southeast China
Flora of Hainan
Plants described in 1928